Conmemorativo: A Tribute to Gram Parsons is an album of covers of singer-songwriter Gram Parsons' songs released by Rhino in 1993. It features 17 tracks recorded by artists from the indie rock and Americana music scenes of the time, including Uncle Tupelo, Vic Chesnutt, Bob Mould, Victoria Williams, The Mekons and R.E.M.'s Peter Buck.

Covers albums
1993 compilation albums
Folk rock compilation albums